Renfrew Football Club are a Scottish football club based in the town of Renfrew. The Frew wear a home shirt of blue and white stripes

History
Renfrew formed in 1912 after the previous Junior club in the town, Renfrew Victoria, went defunct in 1910; they also played at Western Park. A "senior" club based in Renfrew had also operated in the 19th century, and competed in the early years of the Scottish Cup.

The early years of the club saw the semi-finals of the national competition, the Scottish Junior Cup, reached several times – in 1914, 1918, 1933, 1936, 1947 and more recently 1978. The final has been reached three times, in 1917, 1962 and 2001. The first occasion saw no goals conceded on the way to the final, and it was only by a single goal that the final itself was lost, and this after a replay. Similarly, it was after a replay in 1962, when Rob Roy were the victors.

However, May 2001 saw Renfrew win their first Scottish Cup after defeating Carnoustie Panmure in the final at Firhill in Glasgow. After a tense 90 minutes of regulation time and 30 minutes of extra time, Renfrew won the match on penalties with captain Neil Shearer scoring the winner.

On 8 August 2015, New Western Park opened its doors with a 2–0 home win for Renfrew against Renfrewshire neighbours Johnstone Burgh.

Honours

Scottish Junior Cup
Winners: 2000–01
Runners-up: 1916–17, 1961–62

SJFA West
Super League First Division
Runners-up: 2005–06
Central First Division
Winners: 2015–16

Other Honours

Central League A Division winners: 1969–70
Central Division One winners: 1991–92
Scottish Junior League Division One winners: 1914–15, 1915–16
Glasgow Dryburgh Cup: 1945–46, 1963–64
Central League Cup: 1971–72, 1981–82
War Fund Cup: 1917–18
Victory Cup: 1918–19
Renfrewshire Cup: 1916–17, 1917–18, 1919–20, 1926–27, 1931–32, 1932–33, 1940–41, 1942–43, 1945–46, 1965–66
Renfrewshire Consolidation Cup: 1923–24, 1932–33, 1949–50, 1951–52
Kirkwood Shield: 1919–20 (shared), 1924–25, 1933–34, 1936–37, 1962–63
Renfrewshire Dunbartonshire Cup: 1930–31, 1945–46, 1948–49, 1957–58, 1958–59
Elder Cottage Hospital Cup: 1945–46
Erskine Hospital Charity Cup: 1955–56, 1960–61, 1962–63, 1974–75
Strathclyde Cup: 2022–23

See also
:Category:Renfrew F.C. players

References

External links
 Website

 

 
Association football clubs established in 1912
Football clubs in Scotland
Scottish Junior Football Association clubs
Football in Renfrewshire
1912 establishments in Scotland
West of Scotland Football League teams
Renfrew